"Picture Me" is a song recorded by American country music artist Davis Daniel. It was released in May 1991 as the first single from his debut album Fighting Fire with Fire. The song reached No. 28 on the Billboard Hot Country Singles & Tracks chart. The song was written by Brian R. Shaw and Mentor Williams.

Chart performance

References

1991 debut singles
1991 songs
Davis Daniel songs
Song recordings produced by Ron Haffkine
Songs written by Mentor Williams
Mercury Records singles